Lydia Kay Griggsby (born January 16, 1968) is a United States district judge of the United States District Court for the District of Maryland. She is a former Judge of the United States Court of Federal Claims and Chief Counsel for Private and Information Policy for the Senate Judiciary Committee.

Education and career 

Griggsby received a Bachelor of Arts degree in 1990 from the University of Pennsylvania. She received a Juris Doctor in 1993 from the Georgetown University Law Center. She began her legal career as an associate with the law firm of DLA Piper LLP, from 1993 to 1995. She served as a trial attorney in the Commercial Litigation Branch of the Civil Division of the United States Department of Justice, from 1995 to 1998. She served as an Assistant United States Attorney in the District of Columbia, from 1998 to 2004. She worked as Counsel for the United States Senate Select Committee on Ethics, from 2004 to 2005. She served as Privacy Counsel for the United States Senate Committee on the Judiciary from 2004 to 2008, and as Chief Counsel for Privacy and Information Policy for senator Patrick Leahy on the same committee until 2014.

Federal judicial service

United States Court of Federal Claims service 
On April 10, 2014, President Barack Obama nominated Griggsby to serve as a Judge of the United States Court of Federal Claims, to the seat vacated by Judge Francis Allegra, whose term expired October 21, 2013. A hearing on her nomination before the United States Senate Judiciary Committee was held on June 4, 2014. On June 12, 2014, her nomination was reported out of committee by voice vote. On December 3, 2014, Senate Majority Leader Harry Reid filed for cloture on her nomination.

On December 4, 2014, the Senate invoked cloture on Griggsby’s nomination by a 53–36 vote. Later that day, her nomination was confirmed by a voice vote. She received her commission on December 5, 2014. She took the oath of office on December 15, 2014. Her service on the Claims Court terminated on July 23, 2021 when she was sworn in as an Article III district court judge.

District court service 

On March 30, 2021, President Joe Biden announced his intent to nominate Griggsby to serve as a United States district judge for the United States District Court for the District of Maryland. On April 19, 2021, her nomination was sent to the Senate. President Biden nominated Griggsby to the seat vacated by Judge Catherine C. Blake, who assumed senior status on April 2, 2021. On May 12, 2021, a hearing on her nomination was held before the Senate Judiciary Committee. On June 10, 2021, her nomination was reported out of committee by a 16–6 vote. On June 16, 2021, the United States Senate invoked cloture on her nomination by a 57–41 vote. Her nomination was confirmed later that day by a 59–39 vote. She received her judicial commission on July 20, 2021. She was sworn in on July 23, 2021. As of October 2022, she is the seventh Native American federal judge in the United States, and the fifth serving on the bench. She is the first woman of color to serve as a judge on the district court in Maryland.

See also 
 List of African-American federal judges
 List of African-American jurists
 List of Native American jurists

References

External links 
 

|-

1968 births
20th-century American lawyers
20th-century American women lawyers
21st-century American judges
21st-century American lawyers
21st-century American women lawyers
21st-century American women judges
African-American lawyers
African-American judges
African-American women lawyers
Georgetown University Law Center alumni
Judges of the United States Court of Federal Claims
Judges of the United States District Court for the District of Maryland
Lawyers from Washington, D.C.
Living people
United States Article I federal judges appointed by Barack Obama
United States Department of Justice lawyers
United States district court judges appointed by Joe Biden
United States Senate lawyers
University of Pennsylvania alumni